Fireblazin is a deluxe single by the CEDM group Capital Kings from their album II. It was released on CD and digital download on August 19, 2014.

Composition 
Fireblazin and all the Fireblazin remixes (except for the remix by Neon Feather) has a BPM of 130. The Neon Feather remix has a BPM of 140. The song features "gang vocals [and] electronic drums."

Track listing 
Digital download
 "Fireblazin" – 4:16
 "Fireblazin (Radio Mix)" – 4:17
 "Fireblazin (Soul Glow Activatur Phenomenon Remix)" – 4:53
 "Fireblazin (Neon Feather Remix)" – 3:37

Compact Disc
 "Fireblazin" – 4:16
 "Fireblazin (Radio Mix)" – 4:17
 "Fireblazin (Soul Glow Activatur Phenomenon Remix)" – 4:53
 "Fireblazin (Neon Feather Remix)" – 3:37
 "Ooh Ahh"

Charts and certifications

Release history

References 

2014 songs
2014 singles
Capital Kings songs
Songs written by TobyMac
Gotee Records singles